Maayke Se Bandhi Dor is a soap opera that aired on Star Plus. It is a remake of Tamil serial Kolangal of Sun TV. The show ran from 14 February 2011 to 2 October 2011. The show was also broadcast on a television channel in Afghanistan called Ariana TV.

Plot
Set against a Marathi backdrop, Mayake Se Bandhi Dor is a tale about Avani, a character who is struggling against the social conventions that affect women in India. The show focuses on the themes of a woman's powers of forgiveness and pliability.

Avani is the sole bread-winner of her family and must support her mother, her brother, and her two sisters. Her mother is desperate to get her married but Avani has other plans. She wants to find homes and happiness for her brother and her two sisters first. At her mother's insistence, Avani finally agrees to give marriage a chance, but only on two conditions. The first condition is that she be able to continue to work after the marriage. The second condition is that she be able to continue to provide her salary to her family.

Avani meets Bhaskar who accepts her conditions and they agree to marry. The festivities begin but Bhaskar and his family have ulterior motives. They want to be the beneficiaries of Avani’s high salary and her affluent relatives, Kaka and Boss.  Later, Bhaskar relents and asks Avani for forgiveness.  Avani forgives him and they restart their relationship. Bhaskar's mother, Aii still hates Avani, however, because she thinks that Avani is stealing her son away from her. Then Avani sees her father alive, and Lata finds out that Aditi is gone so Avani and Bhaskar go to her house. Kartik and Abha marry. In the end, Avani forgives her father and Kaveri.

Maayke Se Bandhi Dor ended on 2 October 2011, having aired 170 episodes.

Cast

Main
 Shweta Munshi as Avani
 Rohit Khurana as Bhaskhar

Additional
 Bharat Chawda as Muksaare
 Krutika Gaikwad as Aditi
 Ankur Moondhra as Rajesh
 Uvara Patil as Nit
 Bhuvnesh Mann as Karthik
 Aishwariya Narkar as Kaveri
 Rohini Hattangadi as Lata
 Anjan Srivastava as Mangesh
 Anand Goradia as Prabhu
 Riya Patil as Kid Avani
 Damini Joshi as Usha
Vaishnavvi shukla as Aditi daughter

Guest appearance
 Pooja Gor as Pratigya from Mann Ki Awaaz Pratigya

Production

The production of the series began on August 2010. Initially supposed to premiere on an afternoon slot in December 2010. But, the CEO of UTV Santosh Nair wanted a prime slot which was not vacant then. Thus they waited for it and it premiered on 14 February 2011.

The series is based on the backdrop of Maharashtra.

Reception
Maayke Se Bandhi Dor is India's first television series filmed in a HD format for StarPlus.

The Indian Express rated two and half stars and said, "Shweta Munshi as Avni is a decent actress and so is Rohit Khurana who plays her fiancé. Rohini Hattangady as the Shashikala-meets-Lalita-Pawar mother-in-law digs deep into her saas role while Anjan Srivastav as the meek father is endearing and we want to shake up Aishwarya Narkar, the helpless ladki ki maa. The person who gets our goat is Aanand Goradia as the son-in-law, he goes absolutely OTT and speaks in a weird Maharashtrian accent."

The series since its inception could not garner good expected ratings. The wedding sequence of the leads garnered an average rating of 1.62 TVR. In third week of September 2011 it garnered 1.6 TVR.

References

StarPlus original programming
Indian television series
2011 Indian television series debuts
2011 Indian television series endings
UTV Television
Hindi-language television series based on Tamil-language television series